Kyle Edwards may refer to:

 Arda Ocal (born 1981), Canadian former professional wrestler who used the stage name Kyle Edwards
 Kyle Edwards (footballer, born 1997), Saint Vincent and the Grenadines footballer
 Kyle Edwards (footballer, born 1998), English footballer